Eulonchus tristis is a species of small-headed flies in the family Acroceridae.

A study in 2008 found that individuals of the species visiting flowers of Brodiaea elegans and Iris douglasiana in California carried large pollen loads, with no differences in amount or diversity with respect to sex. The species may be an important pollinator, particularly of Brodiaea elegans and Iris bracteata.

References

Further reading

 

Acroceridae
Articles created by Qbugbot
Insects described in 1872